The Barah Valley is a village in Gilgit Baltistan. Barah Valley is 100 km from Skardu in the east. The valley is located on the bank of Shyok river in the Khaplu, (Ghanche District) of Baltistan.

Ethnography
The people are Balti and mostly belong to the Noorbakshia and Sunni sects of Islam.

100% of Barah bala people are Noorbakshia and Barah pain is 90%
Noorbakshia and 10% other communities.

Beauties of Barah valley 
Barah valley is not only famous for its natural herbs and dry fruits but also, make a surprise due to its delightful and charming aesthetic viewpoints.

The Barah Broq Trek 
The Barah Broq Trek is a suitable option for those who want to go trekking and hiking. It was recently discovered by Mr. Musa Khan, a local photographer and trekking enthusiast, and is located in the Barah Valley of Karakoram. Read here about the details Barah Broq Trekking Guide | Moses Peak Barah Valley

References 

Populated places in Ghanche District
Baltistan